"Yonaguni" is a song by Puerto Rican rapper and singer Bad Bunny. It was released on June 4, 2021, through Rimas Entertainment, along with the music video. The song's title refers to Yonaguni Island in Japan, with Bad Bunny performing in Spanish and Japanese. The song topped the Billboards Hot Latin Songs chart and reached number 3 on the Billboard Global 200.

Composition
"Yonaguni" is a reggaeton and progressive pop song. Billboards Jessica Ruiz noted Bad Bunny returned to his "vulnerable and emo lyrics" for the "chill" reggaeton song, different from his "newfound alternative perreo sound" of his previous studio albums. In the song, Bad Bunny tells his love interest that he will travel to Yonaguni for her if she wants and names a list of things that he is willing to do to get back with her, putting aside the guy she is currently dating. The track features reggaeton beats, vocal melodies, and a Japanese-language outro.

Music video
Bad Bunny released the music video along with the song. Directed by Stillz, it follows the rapper throughout the day, as he tries to forget a love interest. Seeking distractions, the protagonist is seen dining alone at a sushi restaurant, walking dogs, practicing martial arts and yoga, getting a Pokémon Go tattoo, and going to a party.

Commercial performance
The song reached number 3 on the Billboard Global 200 and number 4 on the Global Excl. US chart. Commenting on that, Billboards Eric Frankenberg noticed is unusual for Spanish-language music to perform better on the Global 200 than the Global Excl. US chart. In the United States, it debuted at number 10 on the Billboard Hot 100, the highest Latin-music debut of 2021, becoming his fourth top 10 entry and first with no accompanying acts. It became his eighth number-one on the US Hot Latin Songs chart, and record-breaking 40th top 10 single, thus breaking a tie with Enrique Iglesias and Luis Miguel, each with 39 top 10s.

Charts

Weekly charts

Year-end charts

Certifications

See also
List of Billboard number-one Latin songs of 2021

Release history

References 

Bad Bunny songs
2021 songs
2021 singles
Spanish-language songs
Japanese-language songs
Songs written by Bad Bunny